John Raymond Harkins (September 7, 1932 – March 5, 1999) was an American stage, film, and television actor.

Life and career
Born in St. Louis, Missouri, where he attended Normandy High School, Harkins began acting professionally in the mid-1950s on the Broadway stage after studying at the University of Iowa. A life member of The Actors Studio, Harkins appeared in productions of The Terrible Swift Sword, Good as Gold, and Mother Courage and Her Children, prior to making his television debut in a 1965 episode of The Trials of O'Brien. The next year, Harkins made his film debut in The Three Sisters, opposite Shelley Winters and Geraldine Page. From 1967 to 1970, he appeared in various roles on Dark Shadows, and appeared in guest roles on Harry O, and had roles in several television movies. In 1975, Harkins had a recurring role on the CBS sitcom Doc.  He also appeared in "Chuckles Bites the Dust", a memorable episode of The Mary Tyler Moore Show, as the reverend.

During the 1980s, Harkins continued with roles in television and films appearing as a cynical lawyer in the 1981 thriller Absence of Malice, starring Paul Newman, an ill-fated real-estate agent in the 1983 horror film Amityville 3-D,1983 in The Return Of The Man From U.N.C.L.E[The Fifteen Years Later Affair] and former Communist and Cold War-era figure Whittaker Chambers in the 1984 PBS mini-series, Concealed Enemies. From 1985 to 1987, he portrayed Bruce Mansfield, a recurring character on Cagney & Lacey (he later reprised the role in the 1994 television reunion movie Cagney & Lacey: The Return). In 1988, Harkins co-starred in the television adaptation of Inherit the Wind starring Jason Robards and Kirk Douglas, followed by a role in Slaves of New York. One of Harkins' last onscreen appearances was in the 1996 HBO film Crime of the Century.

Harkins died on March 5, 1999, in Portola Valley, California.

Filmography

References

External links
 John Harkins at the Wisconsin Historical Society's Actors Studio Audio collection, 1956-1969
 John Harkins at the Internet Off-Broadway Database
 
 
 

1932 births
1999 deaths
20th-century American male actors
20th-century American singers
Male actors from Missouri
American male film actors
American male stage actors
American male television actors
Musicians from St. Louis
Male actors from St. Louis
University of Iowa alumni
Singers from Missouri